Norbert Brami (born 12 February 1937) is a Tunisian fencer. He competed in the individual foil and épée events at the 1960 Summer Olympics.

References

External links
 

1937 births
Living people
Tunisian male épée fencers
Olympic fencers of Tunisia
Fencers at the 1960 Summer Olympics
Sportspeople from Tunis
Tunisian male foil fencers
20th-century Tunisian people